Zlatko Sedlar (born 7 March 1972) is a Croatian slalom canoeist who competed from the mid-1990s to the early 2000s. He won a silver medal in the C-1 team event at the 1995 ICF Canoe Slalom World Championships in Nottingham.

References

Zlatko Sedlar - Kajak kanu klub Zagreb 

Croatian male canoeists
Living people
1972 births
Medalists at the ICF Canoe Slalom World Championships